Laura Ruhnke (born 25 December 1983) is a Swiss ice hockey player. She competed in the women's tournament at the 2006 Winter Olympics.

References

1983 births
Living people
Swiss women's ice hockey players
Olympic ice hockey players of Switzerland
Ice hockey players at the 2006 Winter Olympics
Ice hockey people from Bern